Canadian country music singer Dallas Smith's discography consists of four studio albums, 
five extended plays, twenty-five singles, and twenty-four music videos.

Smith signed with 604 Records in 2011 after previously serving as lead singer of the rock band Default. Since then, he has released four albums: Jumped Right In, Lifted, Side Effects, and Timeless. These albums have produced over twenty collective top-10 singles on Canadian country radio, including a Canadian record eleven number-one hits.

Default

Studio albums

Extended plays

Singles

2010s

2020s

Other singles

Christmas singles

As featured artist

Music videos

References

Country music discographies
Discographies of Canadian artists